Raleigh Road United Church, at the corner of Raleigh Road and Stanmore Gardens in Richmond, London, is a joint congregation of a Methodist Church and a United Reformed Church.  The churches, formerly known as Kew Road Methodist Church and St. Paul's Congregational Church, have been united since September 1995.

History

St Paul's Congregational Church, on Raleigh Road, opened on 12 December 1898 to provide for the religious needs of a rapidly growing new district of Richmond. The only other Congregational church in Richmond was situated in The Vineyard, a mile and a half away. The building was funded mainly by Alderman Sir Charles Burt, a prominent member of The Vineyard Church and a former mayor of Richmond. That building was destroyed by enemy action on 1 October 1940 and the current building was opened on 8 December 1956.

Kew Road Methodist Church opened in 1868, on a site purchased from a portion of the Countess of Shaftesbury's estate. It originally acted as a chapel on Sundays and, until 1927, a day school during the week. An additional chapel, which seated 1,000 people, was added in 1872. This was destroyed by fire in 1881, and was rebuilt in 1882.

In 1933 a new church was required to accommodate both Kew Road and Sheen Road churches and it was decided to develop the Kew Road site.
In 1937 the old church was demolished and a new church was erected. This closed in 1995 with the merger with St Paul's United Reformed Church and was replaced with a block of flats.

Minister
The minister is Revd Claudia Lupi.

Activities

Services are held on Sunday mornings at 10.30 am. During school terms there is also a Junior Church session at the same time.

The church has three halls, which are used for private functions and community groups.

References

External links
Official website

Churches bombed by the Luftwaffe in London
Churches completed in 1937
Methodist churches in the London Borough of Richmond upon Thames
Richmond, London
United Reformed churches in the London Borough of Richmond upon Thames